Sean James Spencer (born May 29, 1975) is a former American professional relief pitcher for the Seattle Mariners and Montreal Expos of Major League Baseball (MLB).

Career
Spencer attended the University of Washington, where he played college baseball for the Huskies from 1994–1995. In 1995, he played collegiate summer baseball with the Brewster Whitecaps of the Cape Cod Baseball League. He was selected by his hometown Seattle Mariners in the 40th round of the 1996 Major League Baseball draft. He made his major league debut with the Mariners on May 6, pitching 1/3 of an inning and giving up 2 earned runs against the Cleveland Indians. On August 10, Spencer was announced as the first of two PTBNLs traded to the Montreal Expos for Chris Widger. In 8 games for Montreal, he struck out 6 and had an ERA of 5.40. The Expos released him on July 19, . On July 25, Spencer signed a minor league contract with the Baltimore Orioles and pitched in the minors for them until his retirement after the  season.

Spencer played for Greece in the 2004 Summer Olympics in Athens, Greece.

References

External links

1975 births
Living people
Aberdeen IronBirds players
American expatriate baseball players in Canada
Baseball players at the 2004 Summer Olympics
Baseball players from Washington (state)
Bowie Baysox players
Brevard County Manatees players
Brewster Whitecaps players
Greek baseball players
Lancaster JetHawks players
Montreal Expos players
Major League Baseball pitchers
Olympic baseball players of Greece
Orlando Rays players
Ottawa Lynx players
Seattle Mariners players
Tacoma Rainiers players
University of Washington alumni
Washington Huskies baseball players
Anchorage Glacier Pilots players